Richard Cecil is an American poet born on March 14, 1944, in Baltimore and lived in Richmond, Virginia. He graduated from Indiana University, later marrying Maura Stanton in 1971. Previously teaching at Rhodes College, currently teaching at Indiana University as a lecturer on the subject of creative writing as well as teaching in the Hutton Honors College on the same subject. His work has appeared in American Poetry Review, Crab Orchard Review, Poetry, Ploughshares, New England Review, The Georgia Review, Missouri Review, Southern Review, River Styx, and the Virginia Quarterly Review.

Life
Born on March 14, 1944, in Baltimore, Cecil married Maura Stanton in 1971, and lived in Richmond, Virginia. He graduated from Indiana University.

He taught at Rhodes College.
He currently works at Indiana University as a teacher of creative writing and also teaches in the Hutton Honors College.
He briefly taught at Lock Haven University of Pennsylvania, teaching American Poetry courses and running Poetry workshops, in 1987 and 1988.

His work has appeared in American Poetry Review, Crab Orchard Review, Poetry, Ploughshares, New England Review, The Georgia Review, Missouri Review, Southern Review, River Styx, Virginia Quarterly Review.

Quotations
"Everything turns into gin in the end." - Richard Cecil, Hutton Honors College, Indiana University, Bloomington IN (3/18/2019).

Awards
 1998 Crab Orchard Award 2nd

Works

Ploughshares

References

Year of birth missing (living people)
Living people
American male poets
Indiana University alumni
Rhodes College faculty
Indiana University faculty